This is a list of films produced in Morocco.

References

External links
 Moroccan film at the Internet Movie Database

 
Morocco
Morocco
Films